Book Depository (previously The Book Depository) is a UK-based online book seller with a large catalogue, offering free shipping to over 160 countries. Founded by a former Amazon employee, it was acquired by Amazon on July 4, 2011.

History
The company was founded in 2004 by Andrew Crawford and Stuart Felton. Its motto is to make "All Books Available to All" by improving selection, access and affordability.

Awards
In 2012, Book Depository was a finalist for the Fast Growth Business Awards' Retail/Leisure Business of the Year award, and won two UK Startup Awards, Online Business of the Year and Retailer of the Year.

In 2013, it was ranked 5th in the Sunday Times Fast Track 100.

In 2009 and 2010, it won Direct Bookselling Company of the Year at the Bookseller Industry Awards, and the Queen's Award For Enterprise.

See also 

 List of online booksellers

References

External links
 

2004 establishments in the United Kingdom
Bookshops of the United Kingdom
Retail companies established in 2004
Book selling websites
Amazon (company) acquisitions
Online retailers of the United Kingdom
Online bookstores